The siege of Corinth (also known as the First Battle of Corinth) was an American Civil War engagement lasting from April 29 to May 30, 1862, in Corinth, Mississippi. A collection of Union forces under the overall command of Major General Henry Halleck engaged in a month-long siege of the city, whose Confederate occupants were commanded by General P.G.T. Beauregard. The siege resulted in the capture of the town by Federal forces.

The town was a strategic point at the junction of two vital railroad lines, the Mobile and Ohio Railroad and the Memphis and Charleston Railroad. Former Confederate Secretary of War LeRoy Pope Walker called this intersection "the vertebrae of the Confederacy". General Halleck argued: "Richmond and Corinth are now the great strategic points of the war, and our success at these points should be insured at all hazards". Another reason for the town's importance was that, if captured by Union forces, it would threaten the security of Chattanooga, Tennessee, and render Southern control of the track west of that East Tennessee bastion meaningless.

The siege ended when the outnumbered Confederates withdrew on May 29. This effectively cut off the prospect of further Confederate attempts to regain western Tennessee. The Union forces under Ulysses S. Grant took control and made it the base for Grant's operations to seize control of the Mississippi River Valley, and especially the Confederate stronghold of Vicksburg, Mississippi. Grant would later recall, in his memoirs, the importance Corinth held in the cause of a Union victory in the region: "Corinth was a valuable strategic point for the enemy to hold, and consequently a valuable one for us to possess ourselves of". General C. S. Hamilton would later recount that the importance of Corinth was summed up as such: "The Confederate armies had been driven from the Ohio River, almost out of the States of Tennessee and Kentucky a steadying back for a distance of 200 miles Federal occupation reaching the Gulf States where chivalrous foes had been sure Yankee would never set foot". Sherman too would later write of the importance that Corinth held after the Second Battle of Corinth was concluded: "In Memphis I could see its effects upon the citizens, and they openly admitted that their cause had sustained a death-blow".

With the siege of Corinth completed, Federal troops had the opportunity to strike towards Vicksburg or Chattanooga, but it would be after the Second Battle of Corinth that October that Grant would strike for Vicksburg. The Siege of Corinth was described by General Sherman as a change in the tactics in West Tennessee: "The effect of the battle of Corinth was very great. It was, indeed, a decisive blow to the Confederate cause in our quarter, and changed the whole aspect of affairs in West Tennessee. From the timid defensive we were at once enabled to assume the bold offensive".

Background

Military situation

Following the Union Army victory at the Battle of Shiloh on April 6–7, Maj. Gen. Henry Halleck amassed three Union armies —the Army of the Tennessee, the Army of the Ohio, and the Army of the Mississippi— for an advance on the vital rail center of Corinth, Mississippi. Made cautious by the staggering losses at Shiloh, Halleck embarked on a tedious campaign of offensive entrenchment, fortifying after each advance. By May 25, 1862, after moving five miles in three weeks, Halleck was in position to lay siege to the town.  Confederate morale was low and Beauregard was outnumbered two to one. The water was bad. Typhoid and dysentery had felled thousands of his men. At a council of war, the Confederate officers concluded that they could not hold the railroad crossover. Sickness had claimed the lives of as many men as the Confederacy had lost at Shiloh.

Opposing forces

Union

The Department of the Mississippi, commanded by Maj. Gen. Henry Halleck, was divided into three wings. Each wing corresponded to one of the three armies under his command. It totaled 120,172 men “present for duty”.

The Army of the Mississippi, designated the “Left Wing”, commanded by Maj. Gen. John Pope, totaled 21,510 men “present for duty”.
The Army of the Ohio, designated the “Center Wing”, commanded by Maj. Gen. Don Carlos Buell, totaled 48,108 men “present for duty”.
The Army of the Tennessee, designated the “Right Wing”, commanded by Maj. Gen. George H. Thomas, totaled 50,554 men “present for duty”.

Confederate

The Army of Mississippi, commanded by General P. G. T. Beauregard, who also held overall command of all Confederate forces at Corinth, consisted of 45,440 men on April 30. It was divided into four corps:

I Corps, commanded by Maj. Gen. Leonidas Polk, 
II Corps, commanded by Maj. Gen. Braxton Bragg, included the divisions of Maj. Gen. Benjamin F. Cheatham and Maj. Gen. Jones M. Withers.
III Corps, commanded by Maj. Gen. William J. Hardee, included the brigades of Col. Robert G. Shaver, Brig. Gen. Patrick Cleburne, Brig. Gen. S. A. M. Wood, and Brig. Gen. John S. Marmaduke.
The Reserve Corps, commanded by Brig. Gen. John C. Breckinridge.

The Army of the West, commanded by Maj. Gen. Earl Van Dorn, consisted of 12,901 men under the divisions of Maj. Gen. Samuel Jones, Maj. Gen. Sterling Price, and Maj. Gen. John P. McCown.

Battle

Farmington

Of Halleck's wing commanders John Pope proved to be the most aggressive during the campaign.  Pope led the army's Left Wing and was furthest away from Halleck's headquarters.  On May 3 Pope moved forward and captured the town of Farmington only a few miles from Corinth.  Instead of moving the Center Wing under Don Carlos Buell forward, Halleck ordered Pope to withdraw and realign with Buell.  General Pierre G. T. Beauregard ordered Earl Van Dorn to attack Pope's advanced wing on May 9.  Pope made a successful withdrawal and rejoined with Buell.  General Braxton Bragg of the Confederate States Army (CSA), who also participated in the attack, had 25,000 men. The Union Army had 12,000 troops on hand.  Van Dorn's corps, barely engaged, had 9 casualties. Daniel Ruggles's division of Bragg's Corp, on the other hand, which bore the brunt of the fighting, suffered casualties of 8 dead, 89 wounded and two missing or captured. The Union Army had 16 killed, 148 wounded and 14 missing or captured.

The 8th Wisconsin Volunteer Infantry Regiment was ordered to draw the enemy out as to count their numbers and they withdrew to a swamp north of town. Wisconsin 8th reported 5 killed, 14 severely wounded, and 19 slightly wounded. Old Abe the Screaming Eagle accompanied the Wisconsin 8th Infantry.  

The  regiment  had  hardly  time  to  establish  its camp  and  realize  its  surroundings  before  it  was  brought  into  action. On  the 28th  of  May,  four  days  after  it  had  reached  the  front,  it  participated  in  the  tail end of the battle  of  Farmington,  contributing a number of killed and wounded.

Russell's House
As the wings of Halleck's army group began to align themselves in front of Corinth, Maj. Gen. William Tecumseh Sherman proposed a plan of attack against the Confederate brigade of Brig. Gen. James R. Chalmers, which had created a strong defensive position at the Russell house along the Confederate front lines.  Sherman met with generals Halleck and George Henry Thomas on May 16 to discuss his plan.  Sherman planned for the brigades of Colonel Morgan L. Smith and Brig. Gen. James W. Denver to lead the attack with Maj. Gen. Stephen A. Hurlbut's division lending support.  On May 17 the attack commenced with Denver on the right, Smith in the center and Hurlbut's reserve to the right.  Chalmers offered a stubborn resistance while some of his men fired from within the Russell house.  The Confederates almost succeeded with a flank attack against Smith's right but were repulsed by Colonel Thomas Kilby Smith and the 54th Ohio Infantry.  As soon as a battery from the 1st Illinois Artillery deployed the advantage was in favor of the Union forces.  Chalmers retreated beyond Philips Creek near the Russell house property and Morgan Smith's brigade occupied high ground on which the house stood.  Sherman's losses were 10 killed and 31 wounded all of which were from Smith's brigade.  Confederate losses were unknown but Sherman reported 12 dead left on the field.  That same day a division under Brig. Gen. Thomas W. Sherman drove off a Confederate force covering a crossing along Bridge Creek.

Widow Surratt Farm
On May 21 Maj. Gen. William "Bull" Nelson ordered Colonel Thomas D. Sedgwick to conduct a reconnaissance-in-force against the Confederate trenches along Bridge Creek near Widow Surratt's farm Sedgwick moved forward from the Union trenches occupied by Brig. Gen. Thomas J. Wood's division and deployed the 20th Kentucky infantry at the edge of a clearing and the 1st Kentucky infantry to the left facing a densely wooded area.  Shortly after deployment the Kentuckians came under fire.  The Confederate resistance was so severe Sedgwick was forced to fall back. Sedgwick brought forward artillery and the 2nd Kentucky infantry while General Wood lent cavalry support from his division.  The Confederates attempted a flank attack against the 1st Kentucky but the Union artillery (personally supervised by Captain Alvan C. Gillem of Buell's staff) and the 31st Indiana infantry in reserve stabilized the line. The Confederates made three more attempts to turn the Union flank  until retiring to a creek beyond the Surratt farm.  General Nelson ordered Sedgwick to hold his position until nightfall, then return to the Union camp. A week later General Buell would mount an attack to gain the high ground surrounding the Surratt farm.

Double Log House
On May 27 Halleck ordered Maj. Gen. William T. Sherman to drive the Confederates from a log house along the Corinth Road and make a strong demonstration against Corinth itself if possible.  At the edge of a cotton field along Sherman's front was a double log house which the Confederates had converted into a block house by removing the chinking between the logs.  Sherman formed an attacking column with Morgan L. Smith's brigade on the left and James W. Denver's brigade on the right.  John A. Logan's brigade (from John A. McClernand's reserve corps) and James C. Veatch's brigade (from Stephen A. Hurlbut's division) were also brought up for support.  Colonel Ezra Taylor fired several artillery rounds to signal the infantry attack.  Denver and Smith quickly overtook the log house by storm and secured the hilltop position.  The Confederates rallied and drove in Sherman's skirmishers but the counterattack was repulsed by the main line of infantry with artillery support.  The following day the rest of Sherman's division and artillery moved forward to the new position which offered a good vantage point into Corinth itself.  Generals Ulysses S. Grant and George H. Thomas were both present on the field during this engagement, giving approval for the behavior of operation.

Surratt's Hill
Confederate infantry had been using a hill in the vicinity of the Widow Surratt farm for picket outposts.  With all his wings in line, Halleck ordered Buell to clear the Confederates off the Surratt farm hill.  Buell chose Maj. Gen. Alexander M. McCook's reserve division to seize the hill to be used as a staging point for a further attack against Corinth. On May 27 McCook organized his brigades into line of attack intending to overwhelm the Confederates by surprise and overwhelming force.  The brigades of Brig. Gen. Lovell H. Rousseau and Brig. Gen. Richard W. Johnson would lead the advance, side by side.  Colonel Frederick S. Stumbaugh's brigade followed in support of Johnson and Colonel Robert L. McCook's brigade (from Thomas W. Sherman's division) in support of Rousseau.  Johnson's brigade encountered some heavy skirmishing but the hill was taken in short time.  McCook's division entrenched and brought heavy artillery to the new position and immediately began to shell the Confederates.  Beauregard's artillery responded with minimal effort.  The engagement at the Surratt farm hill allowed Halleck to bring forward siege guns for the bombardment of Corinth.

Bridge Creek
On May 28 Maj. Gen. Nelson ordered Colonel Sedgwick to seize a Confederate-held crossing of Bridge Creek, a small tributary of the Tuscumbia River.  Sedgwick moved his brigade out from the main Union trenches with the 2nd and 20th Kentucky infantry regiments in the lead.  Sedgwick drove in the Confederate pickets then encountered a larger force guarding the bridge. The Kentucky infantry managed to gain hold of the eastern end of the bridge while Sedgwick ordered forward the 31st Indiana infantry and Captain John Mendenhall's artillery battery.  These reinforcements and artillery forced the Confederates to abandon the bridge completely.

Retreat
With the Federal army preparing to lay siege to the town, a Confederate council of war decided to retreat. Confederate commander General P. G. T. Beauregard saved his army by a hoax. Some of the men were given three days' rations and ordered to prepare for an attack. As expected, one or two went over to the Union with that news. The preliminary bombardment began, and Union forces maneuvered for position. During the night of May 29, the Confederate army moved out. They used the Mobile and Ohio Railroad to carry the sick and wounded, the heavy artillery, and tons of supplies. When a train arrived, the troops cheered as though reinforcements were arriving. They set up dummy Quaker Guns along the defensive earthworks. Camp fires were kept burning, and buglers and drummers played. The rest of the men slipped away undetected, withdrawing to Tupelo, Mississippi. When Union patrols entered Corinth on the morning of May 30, they found the Confederate troops gone. The Union forces took control and made it the base for their operations to seize control of the Mississippi River Valley, and especially the Confederate stronghold of Vicksburg, Mississippi.

Aftermath

John Pope, whose aggressiveness exceeded his strategic capabilities, remarked in his memoirs that Halleck's cautious campaign failed to take full advantage of a glittering array of talented Union officers, including "Grant, Sherman, Sheridan, Thomas, McPherson, Logan, Buell, Rosecrans and many others I might mention."

A Confederate army led by Maj. Gen. Earl Van Dorn attempted to retake the city in October 1862, but was defeated in the Second Battle of Corinth by a Union army under the command of Rosecrans. At times during the second battle, Confederate forces seemed to have the upper hand but would fail to follow up on their successes leading to a devastating defeat for Confederate forces in that region. Rosecrans had the opportunity to crush rebel forces during the battle but failed to follow up his victory, allowing Maj. Gen. Earl Van Dorn to escape from destruction. Corinth would ultimately lead to the operations that would open the Mississippi River valley which was considered by General Chief Henry W. Halleck as, "the opening of the Mississippi River will be to us of more advantage than the capture of forty Richmonds".

See also

Troop engagements of the American Civil War, 1862
List of costliest American Civil War land battles
Siege and Battle of Corinth Sites
Corinth National Cemetery
Second Battle of Corinth

Notes

References
 Clark, Donald A., The Notorious "Bull" Nelson: Murdered Civil War General, Southern Illinois University Press 2011, 
 Fanebust, Wayne, Major General Alexander M. McCook, USA: A Civil War Biography, McFarland 2012, 
 Kennedy, Frances H., ed. The Civil War Battlefield Guide. 2nd ed. Boston: Houghton Mifflin Co., 1998. .
 Smih, Timothy B. Corinth 1862: Siege, Battle, Occupation (2012)

Memoirs and primary sources
 Pope, John. The Military Memoirs of General John Pope. Edited by Peter Cozzens and Robert I. Girardi. Chapel Hill: University of North Carolina Press, 1998. .
 U.S. War Department, The War of the Rebellion: a Compilation of the Official Records of the Union and Confederate Armies. Washington, DC: U.S. Government Printing Office, 1880–1901.

External links
 
 
 CWSAC Report Update
 U.S. Army & Heritage Education Center: Description and map

Siege of Corinth
Siege of Corinth
Siege of Corinth
Corinth
Corinth I
1862 in the American Civil War
Siege of Corinth
Battles of the American Civil War in Mississippi
Corinth I
Corinth I
Battles commanded by Ulysses S. Grant
Siege